"This Ain't My First Rodeo" is a song co-written and recorded by American country music artist Vern Gosdin.  It was released in July 1990 as the lead single from his compilation album 10 Years of Greatest Hits.  Gosdin wrote the song with Hank Cochran and Max D. Barnes.

Background
Gosdin credited the genesis of the song to a workman who used the idiomatic expression which became the song's title:
"I was wanting an addition put on my house, an extra room over my garage.  I met with the carpenters one morning, then left my house and drove to Nashville for the day.  When I got home, they had almost finished the addition.  I complimented them on their work, and one guy said, 'This ain't our first rodeo.' I went into the house and jotted that down, then wrote the song later with Hank [Cochran] and Max [D. Barnes]."

Content
The lyrics explain a tale of experience, including these repeated lines:
This ain't the first time this old cowboy's been throwed
This ain't the first I've seen this dog and pony show 
Honey, This ain't my first rodeo

Chart performance
The song was number 10 in Radio and Records during the week of November 26, 1990. It reached number 14 on Hot Country Songs.

Notes

References
 Stambler, Irwin and Grelun Landon. (2000). Country music: the Encyclopedia.  New York: St. Martin's Griffin. ; ;  OCLC	223221169
 Whiteside, Jonny. (1997). Ramblin' Rose: the Life and Career of Rose Maddox. Nashville, Tennessee: Country Music Foundation Press. ;  OCLC 166509294

1990 singles
Vern Gosdin songs
Songs written by Hank Cochran
Songs written by Max D. Barnes
Songs written by Vern Gosdin
Song recordings produced by Bob Montgomery (songwriter)
Columbia Records singles
1990 songs